Archips machlopis is a moth of the family Tortricidae. It is widely distributed in southern Asia (including Pakistan, Nepal, China, India, Burma, Thailand, Vietnam, Malaysia and Indonesia: Sumatra, Java).

The wingspan is 16–20 mm for males and 18–22 mm for females. The forewing ground colour is brown-cream, although the tornal area is pale. The markings are brown. The hindwings are greyish brown with a yellow apical area. In Malaysia, adults are on wing from July to November, in Indonesia the flight time is February and March, and from July to September.

The larvae feed on Medicago, Gloriosa superba, Cedrela toonica, Rumex, Citrus, Salix, Litchi and Camellia sinensis. They usually roll or tie the leaves of their host plant, but may also be found in shoots or seedpods.

References

Moths described in 1912
Archips
Moths of Asia